"Peter Pickering" was also the name of the man suspected of the murder of Elsie Frost.

Peter Barlow Pickering (24 March 1926 – 21 November 2006) was an English sportsman who played both football and cricket.

Career

Football career
Born in New Earswick, Pickering played as a goalkeeper for New Earswick, York City, Chelsea, Kettering Town and Northampton Town, making a total of 162 appearances in the Football League.

Cricket career
Pickering also played for Northamptonshire. He made a single first-class appearance, during the 1953 season, against Lancashire. From the tailend, Pickering scored 22 runs in the first innings in which he batted, and 37 runs in the second innings. Northamptonshire won the match by one wicket.

References

1926 births
2006 deaths
English footballers
Association football goalkeepers
York City F.C. players
Chelsea F.C. players
Kettering Town F.C. players
Northampton Town F.C. players
English Football League players
English cricketers
Northamptonshire cricketers